Chenaran (also Romanized as Chenārān) is a village in Mehrabad Rural District, Rudehen District, Damavand County, Tehran Province, Iran. At the 2006 census, its population was 372, in 109 families.

References 

Populated places in Damavand County